Blackjack Hollow is a valley in McDonald County in the U.S. state of Missouri.

Blackjack Hollow was named for the blackjack oak timber it contains.

References

Valleys of McDonald County, Missouri
Valleys of Missouri